The original Monterrey La Raza was a professional indoor soccer team based in Monterrey, Nuevo León, Mexico. The team was founded on December 29, 1992 as a member of the Continental Indoor Soccer League.  After the CISL folded, the La Raza took one season off and attempted to join the National Professional Soccer League before joining the World Indoor Soccer League in 1999. The team folded after it was expelled from the WISL before the 2001 season due to the lack of progress on building Arena Monterrey.

Honors
Championships
1995 CISL: Monterrey defeated the Sacramento Knights 12–6, 4–5 (OT), 10–7 to win series 2–1.
1996 CISL: Monterrey defeated the Houston Hotshots 10–6, 6–5 to win series 2–1 in the minigames.
2000 WISL: Monterrey defeated the Dallas Sidekicks 6–5 in shootouts.

Division titles
1995 Eastern Division
1996 Eastern Division
1997 Eastern Division
2000 WISL Regular Season

Year-by-year

Home Arena
The Monterrey Tech Gym was the home turf for La Raza. It had a playing surface of 162 x 82.

Coach
Erich Geyer 1993–1997,1999–2000

References

Association football clubs established in 1992
Football clubs in Monterrey
Association football clubs disestablished in 2001
Continental Indoor Soccer League teams
World Indoor Soccer League teams
Mexican indoor football teams
Defunct football clubs in Mexico
Monterrey La Raza
1992 establishments in Mexico
2001 disestablishments in Mexico